The Curtiss A-8 was a low-wing monoplane ground-attack aircraft built by the United States company Curtiss Aeroplane and Motor Company, designed in response to a 1929 United States Army Air Corps requirement for an attack aircraft to replace the A-3 Falcon. The Model 59 "Shrike" was designated XA-8 (the "Shrike" nickname was not officially adopted).

Development
The XA-8 won a competition against the General Aviation/Fokker XA-7, after which 13 service test aircraft were ordered (five as YA-8s and eight as Y1A-8s). After the completion of testing, 11 of these aircraft were redesignated A-8.

The A-8 was the first Curtiss machine of all-metal low-wing monoplane configuration with advanced features such as automatic leading edge slats and trailing-edge flaps.

Four forward-firing .30 in (7.62 mm) machine guns were mounted in the wheel fairings, and an additional weapon of the same calibre was fitted in the observer's cockpit for rear defense. The standard bomb load was four 100 lb (45 kg) bombs.

One YA-8 was fitted with a radial engine and designated YA-10, while another was used for testing of the Curtiss V-1570 Conqueror engine as the Y1A-8A. This aircraft was redesignated A-8 upon the completion of testing.

46 aircraft were ordered as A-8Bs, however the order was changed to the Model 60 A-12s before production began.

Operational history
The A-8 created a sensation in US aviation circles when it went into service with the 3rd Attack Group at Fort Crockett, Texas in April 1932. All other standard aircraft were of biplane configuration, and the first monoplane fighter (the Boeing P-26A) did not become operational until eight months later.

Variants
XA-8 Model 59, one prototype, (30-387), length , wingspan , gross weight  Curtiss V-1570-23 direct drive engine

YA-8 Model 59A, service test aircraft, 5 built, (32-344 to 32-348), gross weight , one was reworked as the YA-10 prototype with the  Pratt & Whitney Hornet radial engine
Y1A-8 service test aircraft, 8 built, (32-349 to 32-356) gross weight 
A-8 12 redesignated YA-8 and Y1A-8 aircraft
Y1A-8A last Y1A-8 with Curtiss V-1570-57 geared engine, length , gross weight 
A-8A redesignated Y1A-8A aircraft
A-8B cancelled, replaced by A-12 Shrike

Operators

United States Army Air Corps

Specifications (YA-8)

See also

References

A-08 Shrike
A-08
Single-engined tractor aircraft
Low-wing aircraft
Aircraft first flown in 1931